Nagbingou is a department or commune of Namentenga Province in Burkina Faso.

Cities 

 Nagbingou

References 

Departments of Burkina Faso
Namentenga Province